Eitelborn is an Ortsgemeinde – a community belonging to a Verbandsgemeinde – in the Westerwaldkreis in Rhineland-Palatinate, Germany. It belongs to the Verbandsgemeinde of Montabaur, a kind of collective municipality.

Geography

The community lies in the Westerwald between Koblenz, Höhr-Grenzhausen, Montabaur and Bad Ems.

History
In 1377, Eitelborn had its first documentary mention. The founder was a soldier from Arzbach named Udilo. Named after him is the Udilo Park lying on the heights at the edge of the forest. In 1967, this small community in the Augst – a very small region in the Westerwald – was chosen as the prettiest village in the contest Unser Dorf soll schöner werden (“Our village should become lovelier”).

Politics

The municipal council is made up of 21 council members, including the extraofficial mayor (Bürgermeister), who were elected in a municipal election on 7 June 2009.

Coat of arms
The community's arms bear three red lilies stemming from the arms borne by the Lords of Helfenstein, who built the Sporkenburg castle. The golden castle outer wall shows the building as it is today. The fountain is a stylized image of one that has been at the old Town Hall Square (Rathausplatz) since 1950.

Culture and sightseeing

Buildings
About a kilometre south of the village lies the Sporkenburg.

References

External links
 Eitelborn 

Westerwaldkreis